Chara Neofytou (born 18 January 1996) is a Cypriot footballer who plays as a defender for First Division club Avantes and the Cyprus women's national team.

International career
Neofytou capped for Cyprus at senior level during two friendly matches in early 2019.

References

1996 births
Living people
Cypriot women's footballers
Cyprus women's international footballers
Women's association football defenders